Lily Yeh Jan (born January 20, 1947) is a Chinese-American neuroscientist. She is the Jack and DeLoris Lange Professor of Physiology and Biophysics at the University of California, San Francisco, where she collaborates with her husband Yuh Nung Jan as co-PIs of the Jan Lab.

Early life, education, and career 
Lily Yeh was born Yeh Kung-chu (Ye Gongzhu) in Fuzhou, China to two accountants, Yeh Hong-shu and Lee Chuan-hwa. In 1949, her family moved to Taiwan, where she grew up. She attended a prestigious public school, the Taipei First Girls' High School, which is where she was first drawn to science. Even as a high-school student she was particularly drawn to the field of physics and was inspired by the 1957 Nobel Prize in physics awarded to Tsung Dao Lee and Chen Ning Yang as well as the experimental physicist Chien Shiung Wu.

Jan attended National Taiwan University where she earned her B.S. in physics in 1968. She then began her graduate studies with the intention of studying theoretical physics at Caltech. Two years later, in 1970, she was inspired by her thesis advisor, Max Delbrück (winner of the 1969 Nobel Prize), and  Jerome Vinograd to change her field of study to biology. Switching fields involved Jan sitting for a seven-day, open-book, open-library exam in the field of biology after having passed the qualifying exams for physics graduate students and also a placement test in organism biology. Lily Jan's proposal and her subsequent thesis work was focused on structural studies of rhodopsin localization in mammalian photoreceptors and also in plasma membranes. Her co-mentors for her graduate studies were Jean Paul Revel and Max Delbrück. Upon joining the Delbrück group, Jan was a member of the membrane biology subgroup where she performed challenging experiments in black lipid bilayers in the sub-terranean sub-basement of the electrical engineering building. The Jans have shared that from this point forward Delbrück ensured separation of her graduate work from those of her spouse Yuh Nung Jan given his graduate studies with Delbrück were focused on the sensory responses of the fungus Phycomyces to light, among other stimuli.

Lily Jan would go on to hold postdoctoral positions in the laboratory of Seymour Benzer at Caltech and subsequently in the laboratory of Stephen Kuffler at Harvard Medical School. Jan and her husband joined the faculty at University of California, San Francisco in 1979 where are leaders of a joint research group. She has been a HHMI investigator since 1984.

Research 
After graduating from Caltech with her Ph.D. in 1974, Lily Jan and her husband Yuh Nung Jan took summer courses at Cold Spring Harbor Laboratory together. This coursework would mark the beginning their scientific collaboration which has spanned the majority of their careers. After that at Cold Spring Harbor Laboratory, Jan and her husband would both begin postdoctoral fellowships in the group of Seymour Benzer at Caltech. Their first collaborative effort was building an electrophysiology rig in the laboratory towards the purpose of characterizing the neuromuscular junction in Drosophila fly larvae. This effort would lead to their first two collaborative publications which were in print by 1976, only nine years after the Jans first met. During this time, the Jans would first observe that a male mutant ShakerKS133 larvae exhibited an exceptionally large excitatory response after motor stimulation. Unraveling whether the mutant phenotype was linked to the nerve or muscle of Shaker mutant larvae would demarcate the beginning of the Jans' investigations on ion channels.

Jan and her husband joined the faculty as assistant professors at UCSF in 1979 where they set up a joint lab. The two investigators only got $15,000 each in start-up money and 1,000 ft2 to share to set up their lab, however have shared they were drawn to UCSF by the people and the atmosphere.

The early years of the Jans' research group at UCSF was distinguished by their efforts on cloning the Shaker channel and studies of neural development. In the 1980s, their work on neural development was performed in collaboration with Alain Ghysen and Christine Dambly-Chaudiere. The Jans were tenured in 1983 and were selected as Howard Hughes Medical Institute Investigators in 1984. They have shared that from 1983 to 1986 their research goals were challenged by difficulties cloning the Shaker gene. In 1987, they were successful with cloning Shaker and enabling their team to perform functional studies on single potassium ion channels. Their neural development research has been particularly distinguished by breakthroughs in neurogenesis and cell fate specification (cut, numb, atonal, and daughterless).

Since 1994, the Jan lab has been organized in function and development subgroups lead by each co-PI. The function group of the laboratory is led by Lily and largely focuses on the studies of ion channels, their assembly, and their dynamic response to neural activity. The development subgroup led by Yuh Nung has been engaged with questions surrounding dendrite morphogenesis.

Awards 
 Vilcek Prize in Biomedical Science (2017)
 Gruber Prize in Neuroscience (2012)
 Wiley Prize in Biomedical Sciences (2011)
 Albert and Ellen Grass Lecture, Society for Neuroscience (2010)
 Edward M. Scolnick Prize in Neuroscience, Massachusetts Institute of Technology (2010)
 Ralph Gerard Prize, Society for Neuroscience (2009)
 Elected member, American Academy of Arts and Sciences (2007)
 Society of Chinese Bioscientists in America Presidential Award (2006)
 National Institute of Health MERIT Award (2006)
 Distinguished Alumni Award, California Institute of Technology (2006)
 K. S. Cole Award, Biophysical Society (2004)
 Stephen W. Kuffler Lecture, Harvard Medical School (1999)
 Harvey Lecture, New York (1998)
 Elected member, Academia Sinica, Taiwan (1998)
 Elected member, National Academy of Sciences (1995)
 38th Faculty Lecturer Award, University of California, San Francisco (1995)
 W. Alden Spencer Award and Lectureship, Columbia University (1988)
 Klingstein Fellowship Award (1983-1983)
 Alfred P. Sloan Research Fellowship (1977-1979)

Select publications

Personal and family life
In 1967, Lily Jan traveled to Shitou, Taiwan for a hiking trip to celebrate her college graduation. This trip resulted in her meeting Yuh-Nung Jan and the beginning of their relationship. In 1971, they married with a simple ceremony in a Los Angeles courthouse followed by a celebration camping and hiking in Yosemite.

The Jans had their first child together a daughter, Emily Huan-Ching Jan, on August 6, 1977. Lily was still involved in research leading up to her due date and went into early stages of labor in the midst of the group meeting of her postdoctorate lab. Just seven weeks later after celebrating the arrival of Emily, the Jans would move across the country to begin the next stages of their research careers at Harvard Medical School.

Just a few years later, the Jans had established their independent research group at UCSF. In 1984, they were named Howard Hughes Medical Institute investigators. That same year on November 7, 1984 the Jans welcomed their second child, a son named Max Huang-Wen Jan after the Jans’ shared Ph.D. advisor, Max Delbrück.

The Jans have shared that before their children went to college they rarely attended scientific meetings together such that there was always one parent at home with their children. Outside of the lab, they have continued to enjoy their shared interests in hiking, exploration, and nature throughout their careers. And in 2011, after their visiting professorship at the Chinese Academy of the Sciences the Jans accomplished one of their lifelong goals, seeing Mt. Everest together from the base camp in Tibet.

References 

1947 births
Living people
American neuroscientists
American women biologists
American women neuroscientists
Biologists from Fujian
California Institute of Technology alumni
Chinese emigrants to the United States
Chinese women biologists
Chinese women neuroscientists
Educators from Fujian
Howard Hughes Medical Investigators
Members of Academia Sinica
Members of the United States National Academy of Sciences
National Taiwan University alumni
Sloan Research Fellows
People from Fuzhou
Taiwanese biologists
Taiwanese emigrants to the United States
Taiwanese people from Fujian
Taiwanese women scientists
University of California, San Francisco faculty
21st-century American women